Sergey Pavlovich Zalygin (December 6, 1913 in Durasovka, Ufa Governorate, Russian Empire – April 19, 2000 in Moscow) was a Soviet writer and environmentalist, the first non-Communist Party editor-in-chief of the monthly literary magazine  (1986–1998).

Life and literary work 
He was born on December 6, 1913 in Durasovka village (now Sukharevka). His father, Pavel Ivanovich Zalygin, came from a peasant family of the Tambov Province, studied at the University of Kiev, from which he was expelled and exiled to the Ufa Province for revolutionary activity. Zalygin's mother, Lyubov Timofeevna Zalygina (Abkin), was a daughter of a bank employee from the town of Krasny Kholm, Tver Province. She studied at the Women's Higher Courses in Saint Petersburg.

His childhood was spent in the Ural mountains, at the Satka factory. In 1920, the family moved to Barnaul (in Western Siberia), where he graduated from a seven-year school, and, later, the Barnaul Agricultural College. He worked as an agronomist in the Tashtypsky district farm union of Khakassia in 1931, where he witnessed the tragic events of collectivization. In 1933–1939, Zalygin studied at the Omsk State Agrarian Institute at the Department of Irrigation and Reclamation. While a student he was influenced by the works of Russian geographer and meteorologist A. I. Voeykov and V. I. Vernadsky. During World War II, he worked as an engineer-hydrologist at the Salekhard Hydrometeorological Station in the Siberian Military District. After his demobilization, Zalygin returned to the Department of Irrigation and Reclamation at the Omsk Agrarian Institute, where in 1948 he defended his thesis on irrigation systems designing and became department chair.

Zalygin began to write while being a school student. While studying at the Omsk State Agrarian Institute, he worked as a reporter for a local newspaper. He began to write prose fiction in the 1940s. His first book was published in 1941 (Short Stories, Omsk). In 1952, he was first published in the  monthly ( [The Second Act], 1952, No. 9), for which he later submitted a series of essays,  (This Spring, 1954, No. 8) about the interference of authorities in the life of a peasant. This publication brought fame to Zalygin and drew him close to the magazine's editor-in-chief, A. Tvardovsky.

In 1955, Zalygin moved to Novosibirsk and was mainly occupied by his literary work, although not abandoning the science. His biographer Igor Dedkov wrote that  was "an introduction to the philosophy...on which all the main books of Zalygin were built".

The novel describes the catastrophe of the peasant life at the turn of the 1930s, during the collectivization period. "For the first time in the Soviet censored press, the truth about collectivization was told, for the first time collectivization was shown not in the canonical Sholokhov interpretation, but as a tragedy of the Russian peasants, and even more – as a national catastrophe". Official critics accused Zalygin of distorting the "concrete historical truth" and of "ideological and artistic inability". The artistic significance of the novel was highly esteemed by the public. The poet Anatoly Naiman described his impressions upon reading On the Irtysh some thirty years after its publishing in these words: "The day when I read the novel was separated from the events, which I had perceived as a living tragedy from my youth, by more than seventy years....The tragedy did not disappear, did not weaken, it simply moved to the special area reserved for tragedies. I read On the Irtysh as if I were reading Sophocles or Aeschylus".

By the end of the 1960s, Zalygin moved to Moscow and switched exclusively to writing. In 1968–1972, he led a prose workshop at the Literary Institute of A. M. Gorky. In 1969, he became the secretary of the board of the Writers' Union of the RSFSR; in 1986–1990 he entered the secretariat of the Writers' Union of the USSR. He signed a letter written by a group of Soviet writers to the editorial of the Pravda newspaper on August 31, 1973, denunciating Aleksandr Solzhenitsyn and Andrei Sakharov; he was also one of the people who condemned the  almanach in 1979. At the same time, Zalygin was never a member of the Communist Party, and, in 1986, became the first non-party affiliated editor-in-chief of a Soviet literary magazine.

In 1967,  (Salt Ravine), a novel about the events of the civil war in Siberia, based on various historical documents, which Zalygin collected for several years working in the archives, was published. In it, the image of a fanatic-communist is opposed by the main character – the peasant leader Meshcheryakov (his prototype was the partisan commander E. M. Mamontov). In 1973, two of Zalygin's more experimental works were published: the psychological novel  (The South American Variant) and the science fiction novel  (Oska, the Funny Boy). In the novel  (Commission, 1975) Zalygin once again describes the period of the civil war in Siberia. The following, most ambitious, novel,  (After the Storm, 2 vol., 1982–1985), is set in the 1920s. Dedkov described the originality of this novel as "not so much a reproduction of characters...but of various individual or group 'philosophies'. This is an attempt to recreate the 'ideological landscape' of the Soviet Russia of the twenties, an attempt to understand the life of human thought during this period".  became Zalygin's last major work based on historical events. In the 1980s and 1990s, he wrote short stories about modern life. His writings of the 1990s are characterized, generally, by a more free form, they represent a combination of fiction and journalism.

Zalygin also wrote literary-critical works. The most significant of these are about A. P. Chekhov ( (My Poet), 1969) and Andrei Platonov ( (Tales of a Realist and Realism of a Storyteller), 1970).

In 1986, Zalygin became editor-in-chief of the  monthly, which, under him, began to play an important role in Mikhail Gorbachev’s politics of glasnost’. Some parts of this struggle are described by Solzhenitsyn (A grain between two millstones, part 4, 2003, No. 11) and Zalygin himself (Notes that do not need a plot, Oktyabr, 2003, No. 9-11). In 1991, the circulation of  reached 2,700,000.

At the same time, being the head of a prestigious monthly that stood by its "non-partisan" position (politically and aesthetically), he could refuse to publish even renowned authors, causing their resentment (such was the case with the famous Russian writer and former Soviet dissident Vladimir Voinovich, who later called Zalygin a "conformist" for it).

In 1989–1991 Zalygin was People's Deputy of the USSR and a member of the Presidential Council under M.S. Gorbachev.

In 1991, he became academician of the Russian Academy of Sciences (Section of Language and Literature).

Zalygin received the USSR State Prize (1968), the Hero of Socialist Labour title, together with the Order of Lenin (1988), Order of Friendship of Peoples (1993) and other prizes and orders from the USSR and Russian Federation. In 1991, he received the Condé Nast Traveler Environmental Award.

He died on April 19, 2000. He was buried in Moscow at the Troyekurovskoye Cemetery.

Environmental activity 
Though Zalygin quit hydrological engineering in the 1960s, he never ceased to follow attentively what was going on in the country in the sphere of hydro-amelioration and water management resources policies, and took part in public campaigns against ecologically dangerous hydraulic engineering projects which were being worked out by GOSPLAN (State Planning Committee) until the last years of the USSR.

His attitude towards state water management policies changed radically in 1961–1962, when the politically powerful Soviet hydropower agency Gidroproekt came out with the project of constructing a dam and a hydropower station in West Siberia, on the Lower Ob’. "I was shocked and stupefied, – wrote Zalygin later in his memoirs. – Back in my day I had worked in the region as hydroengineer, and I could clearly visualize the enormous devastation which a water reservoir of 132,000 square kilometers would have brought about". Zalygin became one of the prominent participants in the campaign against the Lower Ob’ Dam project. He went to various cities to discuss the matter with specialists – engineers, geologists, scientists. A key turning point in the debate came with the news of massive oil discoveries in the Lower Ob’ basin, but even after that the entrenched hydropower lobby would not yield up easily. Zalygin's articles elucidating the situation were published in one of the leading Soviet newspapers and drew public attention to the problem, converting the opinion of the administration managers. The fight ended in 1963, when a government decree ruled in favor of oil and gas over hydropower as the main priority in West Siberia.

In 1985–1986 Zalygin became one of the organizers of a public campaign against another ambitious project, the Siberian river reversal, aimed at diverting the flow of the Northern (Siberian) rivers southwards, toward the arid agricultural areas of Central Asia. The campaign was successful, and Zalygin regarded it as an evidence of new possibilities for democratic interference in the ecological policies of the state, unheard-of in the Soviet years. Full of enthusiasm, he became the leader of the public association Environment and the World in 1989, and in 1993 joined the ecological party Cedar. But soon his optimism about the ecological policies of the state and public role in decision-taking of the Perestroyka years gave way to disillusionment and dismay. In 1995 he quit the Green party due to discrepancies with its leaders. Yet the problem of relations between man and nature never ceased to worry him; it was central to all his writings of the 90s.

He was briefly member of the ecologist Kedr party in the mid-1990s.

Published works
Most notable books in Russian available on https://www.litmir.me/a/?id=12759 :
  [On the Irtysh] (1964)
  [Salt Valley] (1968)
  [South American Variant] (1973)
  [Commission] (1975) – Sequel to Salt Valley
  [After the Storm] (1985)

S. Zalygin's works have been translated into English, French, German, Armenian, Belarusian, Bulgarian, Bosnian, Chinese, Czech, Estonian, Finnish, Hungarian, Georgian, Japanese, Kyrgyz, Kazakh, Korean, Chinese, Latvian, Lithuanian, Mongolian, Polish, Romanian, Slovakian, Swedish, Ukrainian, Vietnamese.

Most notable English translations:

 The South-American Variant, transl. Kevin Widle (St Lucia, Queensland: University of Queensland Press, 1979)
 The Commission. Transl. D. G. Wilson. Northern Illinois University Press, 1993

Most notable German translations:

 . Übers. Elena Guttenberger. Frankfuhrt: Possev-Verlag, 1966
 . Übers. Larissa Robiné. Berlin: Volk und Welt, 1975
 . Transl. Th. Reschke, J. Elperin, C. und G. Wojtek. Berlin, 1970
  (Южно-американский вариант). Übers. Alexander Kaempfe. München, 1977
 . Transl. Th. Reschke, J. Elperin, C. und G. Wojtek. Berlin, 1970
 . Übers. Lieselotte Remané. Berlin: Volk und Welt, 1980
 . Übers. Günter Löffler, Larissa Robiné. Leipzig: Philipp Reclam, 1983

Notes

Reference works in English

 McLaughlin S., in: The Image of Women in Contemporary Soviet Fiction: Selected Short Stories from the USSR (ed. and transl. by S. McLaughlin) Palgrave Macmillan UK. 1989. Pp. 212–214.
 Hughes, Ann. “Sergey Zalygin and the ‘Zhenskiy Vopros’”. In: Journal of Russian Studies, no. 50 (1986) 38–44.
 Shneidman, Norman N., “Sergey Zalygin: Innovation and Variety”, in: Soviet Literature in the 1970s (Toronto, 1979) pp. 61–74.
 Wilson D. G. Fantasy in Fiction of Sergey Zalygin. Kansas, 1988

1913 births
2000 deaths
People from Bashkortostan
People from Sterlitamaksky Uyezd
Soviet novelists
Socialist realism writers
Russian editors
Russian male novelists
Russian male writers
Soviet editors
Soviet male writers
20th-century Russian male writers
Novy Mir editors
Omsk State Agrarian University alumni
Full Members of the Russian Academy of Sciences
Soviet military personnel of World War II
Recipients of the USSR State Prize
Heroes of Socialist Labour
Recipients of the Order of Lenin
Recipients of the Order of the Red Banner of Labour
Recipients of the Order of Friendship of Peoples
Burials in Troyekurovskoye Cemetery